Hardcase is a 1972 American Western television film directed by John Llewellyn Moxey and starring Clint Walker.  It was the first fully live-action feature film of the Hanna-Barbera studios. The movie appeared on the ABC Movie of the Week on February 1, 1972  where it was a ratings surprise; becoming the seventh most popular show of the week.

Plot
Jack Rutherford has returned to his ranch in Texas after soldiering in the Spanish–American War. Because he was presumed dead, his wife Rozaline remarried a Mexican revolutionary leader named Simon Fuegus. Rozaline also sold Jack's ranch and belongings to buy weapons for Simon's band. Jack travels to Mexico to get his share of the proceeds of the sale but gets nothing. Taking matters into his own hands, Jack decides to raise income by kidnapping Simon for $10,000 ransom to be paid either by Simon's band or the Mexican Federal Government who wish to get their hands on Simon.

Cast
 Clint Walker as Jack Rutherford 
 Stefanie Powers as Rozaline Rutherford
 Pedro Armendáriz Jr. as Simon Fuegus 
 Alex Karras as Booker Llewellyn 
 E. Lopez Rojas as Felipe 
 Luis Mirando as Maj. Tovar 
 Martin LaSalle as Luis Camacho

Production
In 1967, Hanna-Barbera was acquired by Taft Broadcasting.  Iwao Takamoto recalled that Taft was thinking of getting rid of their animation operations with Joe Barbera using the opportunity for the studio to begin live action feature film productions. The film was shot in Mexico and was the feature film debut of Alex Karras as a fictional character (he previously appeared as himself in the 1968 film Paper Lion). Hal Needham was stunt coordinator on the film.

See also
 List of American films of 1972

References

External links
 

1972 Western (genre) films
American Western (genre) television films
1972 television films
ABC Movie of the Week
Films set in Mexico
Films shot in Mexico
Hanna-Barbera films
Films directed by John Llewellyn Moxey
1970s English-language films